The 66th British Academy Film Awards, more commonly known as the BAFTAs, were held on 10 February 2013 at the Royal Opera House in London, honouring the best national and foreign films of 2012. The nominations were announced on 9 January 2013. Presented by the British Academy of Film and Television Arts, accolades were handed out for the best feature-length film and documentaries of any nationality that were screened at British cinemas in 2012.

Stephen Fry hosted the ceremony, where Argo won Best Film and Best Director for Ben Affleck. Daniel Day-Lewis won Best Actor for Lincoln and Emmanuelle Riva won Best Actress for Amour. Christoph Waltz won Best Supporting Actor for Django Unchained and Anne Hathaway won Best Supporting Actress for Les Misérables. Skyfall, directed by Sam Mendes, was voted Outstanding British Film of 2012. Sir Alan Parker received the BAFTA Fellowship and Tessa Ross garnered the BAFTA Outstanding British Contribution to Cinema Award.

Winners and nominees

BAFTA Fellowship
 Sir Alan Parker

Outstanding British Contribution to Cinema
 Tessa Ross

Statistics

In Memoriam

Marvin Hamlisch
Jake Eberts
Ravi Shankar
Celeste Holm
Michael Winner
Ernest Borgnine
Frank Pierson
Sylvia Kristel
Herbert Lom
Cornel Lucas
Robert Fuest
Dinah Sheridan
Chris Challis
Charles Durning
Nora Ephron
Joyce Redman
Richard Zanuck
Patricia Medina
Chris Marker
Martin Poll
Stuart Freeborn
Richard Rodney Bennett
Bruce Surtees
Michael Clarke Duncan
Tony Scott

See also
 2nd AACTA International Awards
 85th Academy Awards
 38th César Awards
 18th Critics' Choice Awards
 65th Directors Guild of America Awards
 26th European Film Awards
 70th Golden Globe Awards
 33rd Golden Raspberry Awards
 27th Goya Awards
 28th Independent Spirit Awards
 18th Lumières Awards
 3rd Magritte Awards
 24th Producers Guild of America Awards
 17th Satellite Awards
 39th Saturn Awards
 19th Screen Actors Guild Awards
 65th Writers Guild of America Awards

References

External links
 66th BAFTA Awards page

Film066
2013 in British cinema
2012 film awards
2013 in London
Royal Opera House
February 2013 events in the United Kingdom
2012 awards in the United Kingdom